Polyanemo (before 1926: Κόρτσιστα - Kortsista) is a village in the Kastoria region, Macedonia, Greece.

The Greek census (1920) recorded 243 inhabitants in the village and in 1923 there were 50 Muslim families.

References

Populated places in Kastoria (regional unit)